Bully beef (also known as corned beef in the United Kingdom, Canada, Australia, Singapore, Indonesia and other Commonwealth countries as well as the United States) is a variety of meat made from finely minced corned beef in a small amount of gelatin. The name "bully beef" likely comes from the French  (meaning "boiled") in Napoleonic times, or possibly from the head of a bull depicted on the popular Hereford brand of canned corned beef. The cans have a distinctive oblong shape. Bully beef and hardtack biscuits were the main field rations of the British Army from the Boer War to World War II. It is commonly served sliced in a corned beef sandwich. Potato-based dishes, such as "hash and hotch-potch", in which the potatoes and beef are stewed together, and "corned beef hash", where pre-boiled potatoes and corned beef are mixed with Worcestershire sauce then fried, are also made. Tinned corned beef is also used in France. Some places where British troops were present in the 20th century (especially during World War II), such as Malta, have adopted bully beef as part of their national cuisine. In February 2009, the British Defence Equipment and Support announced that they would be phasing out bully beef from ration packs as part of the introduction of the new Multi-Climate Ration Packs until this change was reversed due to backlash.

History
The dish soup and bouilli was being called "soup and bully" by 1753, and probably earlier, with the meat portion referred to as "bully beef". As use of canned soup and bouilli increased on merchant ships and in the Royal Navy over the 19th century, sailors were also calling it bully beef and extended the expression to all canned meats.

This would include corned beef, as by 1862 "very good corned beef" – in the opinion of Lord Paget – had replaced "old mahogany" on naval ships.

English soldiers also used the term "bully beef" for their tinned meat ration. This may still have been soup and bouilli in 1871 as there is an account of "bully" soup being served that year at a training exercise, but by the Ashanti War of 1873–1874, corned beef was being used, with a newspaper reporting one large tin being divided among four officers. Corned beef may have been just introduced as part of soldiers' rations as it was described as a novelty.

During the Zulu Wars of 1879, corned beef was being used extensively with over 500 tons being sent to South Africa in 6 months. Most of this was supplied by American packing companies but about 10% came from Canada and Australia. It was not the only meat; "Boiled tin mutton... or "bully soup" as it is more frequently called was an option for some soldiers.

The iconic rectangular bully beef tin of the Boer War and First World War possibly first appeared in soldiers' rations in this campaign as it was reported that in 1879 over 4,400 tons of preserved beef had been exported to England by Libby, McNeil and Libby, with over 260 tons sent to the troops in South Africa. In 1875, Arthur Libby and W. J. Wilson had obtained a patent for a rectangular can with tapered sides allowing the can's contents "to slide out in one piece, so as to be readily sliced as desired". The meat was precooked to reduce shrinkage and, as described in another patent, packed into the can under pressure "to remove the air and all superfluous moisture", hence the compressed corned beef description on the label. The patents were declared void in 1881 when Prior art was shown to exist, allowing other packing houses to produce similar cans.

As was common at the time, the newspapers used letters from soldiers to provide news of the war, and it was in a letter from Private J. Smith of the 91st Highlanders that the expression "bully beef and biscuits" first appeared in print. A few years later, owing to the intense interest it created in England, correspondents accompanied Lord Wolseley's expedition to relieve General Charles George Gordon and his Egyptian troops, besieged in Khartoum. The journey up the Nile took months and with no fighting to report, journalists wrote about the more mundane aspects of soldier's lives with mentions of 'bully beef' appearing in a majority of their articles and 'bully beef and biscuits' appearing occasionally.

The next development was the key open can. Both J. Osterhoudt, in 1866, and Arsène Saupiquet in 1882, had patented key open cans, with possibly only Saupiquet achieving commercial success, but it was not until a cheaper method of production was developed by John Zimmerman in 1892 that American companies adopted the innovation, with Cudahy's, Libby's and Armour soon producing corned beef in the easy to open tins. The British Government was slow to adopt the new cans, and in 1898 the Civil and Military Gazette saw it as scandalous that they were still supplying meat in "unget-at-able" tins when the new cans were available.

See also
 Potted meat

References

Beef